Aarush Bhagwat (born 12 September 2003) is a Hong Kong cricketer. In September 2019, he was named in Hong Kong's Twenty20 International (T20I) squads for the 2019–20 Oman Pentangular Series and the 2019 ICC T20 World Cup Qualifier tournament in the United Arab Emirates. He made his T20I debut for Hong Kong, against Oman, on 5 October 2019.

In November 2019, he was named in Hong Kong's squad for the 2019 ACC Emerging Teams Asia Cup in Bangladesh. He made his List A debut for Hong Kong, against India, in the Emerging Teams Cup on 18 November 2019. Later the same month, he was named in Hong Kong's squad for the Cricket World Cup Challenge League B tournament in Oman. Prior to his international debut, he had also previously played for the Hong Kong Under-19 National cricket-team at the 2018 ACC Under-19 Asia Cup and the Asian Cricket Council's Eastern Region tournament in July 2019. Alongside this, he was also a part of the Hong Kong Under-16 Cricket Team at the 2019 ACC Under-16 Eastern Region Asia Cup.

References

External links
 

2003 births
Living people
Hong Kong cricketers
Hong Kong Twenty20 International cricketers
Place of birth missing (living people)